On 27 January 2020, Caspian Airlines Flight 6936 overran the runway on landing at Mahshahr Airport, Iran, on a domestic flight from Tehran. All 144 people on board survived, with two injured.

Accident
Flight 6936 departed from Tehran at 06:35 local time (02:05 UTC) and landed at Mahshahr Airport at 07:50. The aircraft overran the runway on landing, ending up on the Mahshahr-Sarbandar Expressway,  past the end of the runway. All 144 people on board, including 135 passengers, survived. The aircraft's landing gear collapsed during the overrun. Two people were injured. A witness said that the aircraft's undercarriage did not appear to be fully down as it came in to land. The head of Khuzestan Province's aviation authority stated that the aircraft landed long on the runway, causing the overrun.

Aircraft and crew

The accident aircraft was a McDonnell Douglas MD-83, registration EP-CPZ, msn 53464. It first flew in 1994, then served with several airlines before being transferred to Caspian in 2012.

The captain was a 64-year-old man, who had joined Caspian in 2019, having previously flown for Kish Air and the Iranian Navy. He had 18,430 flight hours, including 7,840 hours on the MD-80. The first officer was a 28-year-old man, who had logged 300 flight hours, with 124 of them on the MD-80.

Investigation
The Iran Civil Aviation Organization opened an investigation into the accident.

On 1 September 2020, the CAO.IRI released its final report and established that the cause is a runway overrun, caused by the following crew errors:
 Poor decision-making for acceptance of the risk of high-speed landing
 Un-stabilized approach against the normal flight profile
 Poor CRM in the cockpit; and
 Poor judgment and not accomplishing go-around while performing an un-stabilized approach.

Other contributing factors are:
 Loading of 5 tons of extra fuel, which increased the landing distance required.
 Decision to make a landing on RWY 13 with tailwind.
 Inability of the copilot (PM) to take control of the aircraft and proper action to execute go around.

Safety recommendations
As a result of this investigation, some recommendations were issued:

To Iran Civil Aviation Organization:
 Require all operators to provide more guidance and enforce further training for pilots and dispatchers, regarding the company's fuel policy, and the assumptions affecting landing distance/stopping margin calculations, to include use of aircraft ground deceleration devices, wind conditions and limits, air distance, and safety margins.
 Submit a formal request to the Cabinet of Ministers of Ir. Iran to correct the RWY strip dimension in Iran Aerodromes Bylaw in accordance with Annex 14 to the ICAO convention.
 Update the information of Mahshahr Airport in Iran AIP.

To Caspian Airlines:
 Perform the Line Operation Safety audit (LOSA) for Flight Crew and Cabin Crew.
 Correct the Simulator Lesson Plans for flight considering the findings of the accident.
 Expand and improve the Flight Data Analysis System.
 Improve communication system between operation department and all crew members about notifying flight planning.

To Mahshahr Airport:
 Follow Iran CAO aerodrome requirements for ANS, control of obstacles, and review Instrument Approach procedures.

To Iran Airports and Air Navigation Company:
 Provide training guidelines for ATS personnel about the agreed coordination between involved ATS units.

References

2020 disasters in Iran
Accidents and incidents involving the McDonnell Douglas MD-83
Aviation accidents and incidents in 2020
Aviation accidents and incidents in Iran
Caspian Airlines accidents and incidents
History of Khuzestan Province
January 2020 events in Iran